Windsor Great Park is a Royal Park of , including a deer park, to the south of the town of Windsor on the border of Berkshire and Surrey in England. It is adjacent to the private  Home Park, which is nearer the castle. The park was, for many centuries, the private hunting ground of Windsor Castle and dates primarily from the mid-13th century. Historically the park covered an area many times the current size known as Windsor Forest, Windsor Royal Park or its current name. The park is managed and funded by the Crown Estate, and is the only royal park not managed by The Royal Parks. Most parts of the park are open to the public, free of charge, from dawn to dusk, although there is a charge to enter Savill Garden.

Except for a brief period of privatisation by Oliver Cromwell to pay for the English Civil War, the area remained the personal property of the monarch until the reign of George III when control over all Crown lands was handed over to Parliament. The Park is owned and administered by the Crown Estate, a public body established by Act of Parliament in which the monarch and family members associated with its particular parts have non-executive, advisory roles. The Grade I listed park is on the Register of Historic Parks and Gardens. Windsor Forest and Great Park is a Site of Special Scientific Interest.

Geography

The Great Park is a gently undulating area of varied landscape. It has sweeping deer lawns, small woods, coverts and areas covered by huge solitary ancient oak trees. There is a small river in the north of the park called the Battle Bourne running to the Thames near Datchet. The River Bourne runs through a number of ponds to the south. Chief amongst these are Great Meadow Pond and Obelisk Pond, near the great lake of Virginia Water. The most prominent hill is Snow Hill and the avenue of trees known as the Long Walk runs between here and Windsor Castle. The area is accessed by a number of gates: Queen Anne's Gate, Ranger's Gate, Cranbourne Gate, Forest Gate, Sandpit Gate, Prince Consort's Gate, Blacknest Gate, Bishop's Gate and Bear's Rails Gate and the original medieval park pale can still be seen in places. The main road known as Sheet Street (A332) into Windsor runs through the northeast of the park. On the western side of the park is The Village, built in the 1930s to house Royal estate workers. It has a village shop and infant/junior school. Other buildings include the Royal Lodge, Cumberland Lodge, the Cranbourne Tower and Norfolk Farm. The park lies mostly within the civil parish of Old Windsor, though the eastern regions are in the Borough of Runnymede and there are small areas in the parishes of Winkfield and Sunninghill. Areas associated with or attached to the Great Park, but not officially within its borders include the Home Park, Mote Park, Flemish Farm, Cranbourne Chase, Forest Lodge and South Forest.

History

Formation

Windsor Castle was begun in the 11th century by William the Conqueror as it afforded a good defensive point over the River Thames. A vast area of Windsor Forest to the south of the castle became reserved by the King for personal hunting and also to supply the castle with wood, deer, boar and fish. It was not until later that it became necessary to formally define this area. In 1129, the first parker was appointed, and in 1240, King Henry III officially set out the borders of the "Park", a region many times larger than the current Great Park. The castle was a mere fortress at this time and, when hunting, King Henry would have been resident at the more comfortable manor house of Old Windsor (what later became known as Manor Lodge). The title "Parker" exists today as "Ranger of the Park", the current title-holder being Charles III. Kings Edward I and Edward III used the park for jousts and tournaments and the latter had his Royal stud there to supply horses for the Hundred Years' War. The moat at Bear's Rails contained the manor house of Wychamere, the home of William of Wykeham while he was building the castle. It was later used for bear-baiting.

Development
By the 18th century, the food value of the parkland to Windsor had decreased in importance and the new Hanoverian monarchs preferred to build on and garden the land rather than hunt in it. The Long Walk had been laid out by King Charles II and the planting of its trees completed by William of Orange in the 1680s, with double rows of elms which lasted until World War II, but the Georges extended it and built numerous features and monuments, such as the Copper Horse (depicting George III) and the Obelisk (in honour of William, Duke of Cumberland). George III had a set of 2,000-year-old Roman ruins imported from Libya and placed in the park.

Virginia Water was begun in 1746 by William, Duke of Cumberland who was then Ranger of the Park. Few details are recorded of the building of the lake; however it has been suggested that prisoners of war from the recent Jacobite risings, who were encamped at the nearby Breakheart hill, were involved.  The original lake was much smaller than the current form, and was destroyed in a flood in 1768. In 1780, Paul and Thomas Sandby began construction of a much larger lake at the site, and went on to add an artificial waterfall, Meadow Pond and Obelisk Pond. The lake replaced a small stream of the same name which was probably named after Queen Elizabeth I, who was known as the "Virgin Queen".

Victorian expansion 

Queen Victoria created the park that still exists. The Windsor Castle Act 1848 was implemented to reform land use and rights around Windsor Castle. This led to the removal of existing roads and the creation of new ones to redirect people away Home Park. The changes were the result of the death of Prince Albert, when Queen Victoria largely withdrew from public life. At Frogmore she built a Royal Mausoleum for Albert. She was later buried there upon her own death, along with a number of other subsequent members of the royal family.

During the 19th and early 20th century, one of the main events for farmers near and far was the Christmas sale of stock from the Royal Windsor Estates.  Held on the same week as the Smithfield Show, buyers came from all over the country to buy something from the monarch.  The sale in 1850 was held on 17 December by Messrs Buckland & Sons of Windsor.  It included Superior Fat Heifers for £20 each; 10 fat ewes, fed by Prince Albert, for 33/10; Fine Old Wether Sheep, fed by His Grace the Duke of Buccleuch, for 40/6.  The sale made a total of £226. On 12 December 1894, Messrs Buckland & Sons were proud to announce:

The Prince Consort's Flemish Farm
A Xmas sale of fat stock belonging to HM the Queen
ON WEDNESDAY, DECEMBER 12, 1894
At One o'Clock precisely
Carriages will meet the Trains at both Windsor Stations

Aviation
The Smith's Lawn area of the Park began to be used for flying in the 1920s, an activity which continued in various forms until the early 1950s. Improvements were made to the grass landing area in the mid 1930s, when it was used by the Prince of Wales (later Edward VIII).  He operated several different types of aircraft from here, including several types of de Havilland airplanes, ranging from Moths to Dragon Rapides.

On 29 April 1931, Gordon Olley landed a large (for the time) twin-engine Imperial Airways airliner, the Armstrong Whitworth Argosy ("City of Glasgow"), at Smith's Lawn.

In 2016, the Duke of Edinburgh unveiled a memorial at Smith's Lawn to its use as an airfield. He himself had made his first solo flight from there in 1952, after regular use of the site as an airfield had ceased.

Second World War
During the war, aviation related activities included a factory dispersal site (to minimize the risk of Luftwaffe bombing) for Vickers-Armstrongs, who built and maintained Wellington bombers here. Other wartime aviation activities included use as a Relief Landing Ground for de Havilland Tiger Moth trainers at nearby No. 18 Elementary Flying Training School at Fairoaks. 

The Smith's Lawn area of the Park was also used for housing troops. During the 1940s, much of the deer park was ploughed and farmed for food, which involved the felling of hundreds of ancient trees. Over 200 large bombs fell on the land, including several V-2 rockets. During the 1948 Summer Olympics, the park was used as the road cycling venue. In the 1950s, the Park was gradually turned into the recreation area open to the public that it is today. This involved the re-planting of Savill Gardens (which had been allowed to run wild during the war) and the new Valley Gardens. In 1951, a large wall for creeping plants was built at Savill using bricks from bombed-out London buildings. In 1958, a Totem pole was installed nearby, a gift from British Columbia to the Queen.

Protests
In 1972 the Irish anarchist Ubi Dwyer organised the "People's Free Festival", the first of the Windsor Free Festivals in the Park, attended by 700 people. A co-organiser Sid Rawle claimed that Windsor Great Park has been common land until the 18th century, and illegally inclosed (made private) by George III. Prince Philip, Duke of Edinburgh was reported to be "furious".  Ubi and his allies repeated the festival in 1973 with at least 1,400 in attendance. In 1973, the Windsor Great Park regulations were introduced. In 1974, 7,000 people turned up but it was violently broken up by police, who made 220 arrests and the festival was banned. Dwyer was jailed the next year for distributing leaflets to promote another festival and Rawle was given three months for reproducing parts of Ubi's leaflets in the underground newspaper International Times.

Features
The modern enclosed deer park is at the northern end of the Great Park. It is home to a large herd of semi-wild red deer, reflecting the original medieval purpose of the park.

The Long Walk

The tree-lined  avenue known as The Long Walk was originally a path from Windsor Castle to Snow Hill. The high ground is said to have been the location where Henry VIII waited to hear the news that his second wife, Anne Boleyn, had been executed. Following the Restoration in 1660, Charles II had double rows of Elm trees planted along the entire length of the path. The king was inspired to develop Windsor Castle and the surrounding parkland after he lived at the Palace of Versailles during his exile from Britain when it was the Commonwealth of England under Oliver Cromwell. The creation of The Long Walk was one of his first improvement plans.

In 1710 Queen Anne had the path through the centre of the trees replaced by a road so coaches could use the route to enter and leave Windsor Castle.

The Copper Horse

The Long Walk runs south from Windsor Castle to The Copper Horse statue of King George III atop Snow Hill. Other equestrian statues in the park include one of the Prince Consort, to the west of the polo grounds, and one of Queen Elizabeth II near the Village.

The Royal Lodge
The Royal Lodge was built in the centre of the park as the Deputy Ranger's house. It was made into a retreat for the Prince Regent from 1812, but was largely pulled down after his death. The remains were renovated, in the 1930s, as a home for the Duke and Duchess of York before their accession as King George VI and Queen Elizabeth. It is now the official residence of  Prince Andrew, Duke of York and not accessible by the public.

The Royal Chapel of All Saints
The Royal Chapel of All Saints was built after the chapels of the Royal and Cumberland Lodges proved too small for growing numbers of household staff. The chapel was built in 1825 by Jeffry Wyattville and regularly used by George IV during the refurbishment of Windsor Castle. It was later remodelled in the Gothic Revival style by Samuel Sanders Teulon and Anthony Salvin. Queen Victoria often attended the chapel as did the Duke and Duchess of York before their accession as King George VI and Queen Elizabeth. It was regularly used by Queen Elizabeth II when she was in residence at Windsor.

Cumberland Lodge
Other notable buildings in the park include Cumberland Lodge, built in 1652 during the Commonwealth. After the restoration of the monarchy in 1660 the Lodge quickly became the home of the Ranger of the Great Park, an office in the gift of the sovereign. Each Ranger made his – or in one case, that of Sarah Churchill, Duchess of Marlborough, her – own mark on the features of the house and its surroundings.

Throughout her life Queen Victoria was a frequent visitor. Her daughter Princess Helena of the United Kingdom lived at the Lodge for over fifty years, presiding over elaborate re-building after a major fire in 1869 and extensive alterations in 1912. Lord FitzAlan, last British Viceroy of Ireland, was the last private person to be entrusted with the Lodge. It was in his time, in 1936, that the Prime Minister, Stanley Baldwin, discussed the crisis over King Edward VIII's desire to marry Wallis Simpson, talks which led to his abdication of the crown a few weeks later. In 1947, the King made the Lodge available to the newly established St. Catharine's Foundation, later known as the King George VI and Queen Elizabeth Foundation of St Catharine's. Today the organisation is simply known as Cumberland Lodge. Cumberland Lodge today is an educational charity dedicated to initiating fresh debate on questions facing society. The grounds are not generally open to the public, but the house is continually holding conferences, open days and lectures.

Cranbourne Tower
The private Cranbourne Tower is easily viewed from surrounding paths. It is all that survives of Cranbourne Lodge, the residence of the Keeper of Cranbourne Chase. It is thought to date back to the 16th century.

Savill Garden

In the south-east of the park, near Englefield Green, are the Savill Garden Garden and Valley Gardens which were designed and built by Eric Savill in the 1930s and 1940s. They include an extraordinary range of flowers and trees from around the world. Smith's Lawn and Polo Grounds are also nearby, as is the tranquil Heather Garden. The Savill Garden Visitor Centre houses a gift shop; toilets; restaurant; coffee shop; ice cream counter; and a shop selling many plants found in the garden.  The gardens are open to visitors between 10:00 and 16:30 in the winter and 10:00 and 18:00 in the summer.

Virginia Water Lake
Virginia Water Lake, in the south of the park, is an artificially-created lake of around  dating from the 1740s.

The Obelisk

Beside a smaller lake, known as the Obelisk Pond, is the Obelisk memorial to the Duke of Cumberland. This is inscribed

It was originally inscribed "Culloden" but this was erased on Queen Victoria's orders and replaced with "Cumberland", inscribed within an inset in the masonry.

Visiting
A new visitor centre designed by Glenn Howells Architects and Buro Happold was opened in June 2006, and was nominated for the 2007 Stirling Prize.
Park access via Rangers Gate is strictly for authorised vehicles only.  There are several other road, horse and foot entrances. Access to some of the private areas of the Great Park is available, on application, for an annual key rental fee.  Access to the park is governed by Windsor Great Park Regulations 1973.

Events
Every five or six years since 1993 Windsor Great Park has been home to the Scout and Girlguiding camp WINGS (Windsor International Guides and Scouts camp), last held in August 2014.

At the 15th World Conference of WAGGGS it was decided to mark the centenary of the birth of Lord Baden-Powell, the founder of Guiding, by holding a World Camp with four locations — Doe Lake, Ontario, Canada; Quezon City, Philippines; Lac de Conche, Switzerland; and Windsor Great Park, from 19 January to 2 February 1957.

Filming location
The Crown Estate has allowed the use of Windsor Great Park as a filming location. The park was used in the production of the following:

 Elton John's 1978 album A Single Man featured the park on the cover and inner booklet.
 Harry Potter and the Half-Blood Prince, Harry Potter and the Deathly Hallows (Part 1 and Part 2)
 Pirates of the Caribbean
 Robin Hood (2010)
 Snow White and the Huntsman
 Into the Woods (2014)
 The King's Speech made extensive use of Cumberland Lodge. 
 King Arthur: Legend of the Sword was on location in the South Forest in early 2015
 The Huntsman: Winter's War used various locations during May and June 2015
 Bridget Jones's Baby was filming on location on Duke's Lane in October 2015
 Flowers from Channel 4 was filming in December 2015 in South Forest and Penslade Bottom, and Windsor Great Park 
 Cinderella (2015)
 The Legend of Tarzan (2016)
 Virginia Water
 Countryfile
 Midsomer Murders
 Scenes from the film Annihilation were shot in South Forest in April 2016
 The Voyage of Doctor Dolittle in June 2018

See also
 Herne the Hunter
 List of Ancient Woods in England
 List of Sites of Special Scientific Interest in Berkshire
 The Merry Wives of Windsor by William Shakespeare
 Violet click beetle
 Windsor Free Festival

References

Further reading
 R. J. Elliott. The Story of Windsor Great Park. 
 Andrew Fielder, 2010, "Windsor Great Park, A Visitor's Guide", 144pages. 
 Anderson Geographics Ltd. The Essential Maps of Windsor Great Park and Central Windsor & Eton. 
 Charles Lyte. The Royal Gardens in Windsor Great Park.

External links

 
11th-century establishments in England
Venues of the 1948 Summer Olympics
English royal forests
Grade I listed parks and gardens in Surrey
Olympic cycling venues
Parks and open spaces in Berkshire
Parks and open spaces in Surrey
Tourist attractions in Berkshire